Nathan Walsh (born 1972) is a contemporary realist painter living and working in Wales, United Kingdom. While he paints in his studio in Wales, he travels abroad to large cities like New York to research his compositions.

Paintings 
Walsh spends days becoming familiar with the ever-changing city landscape in any major city that he visits. He sketches the basic composition of each painting on a postcard-sized piece of paper. Then, he photographs specific areas of the city that he chooses to paint. When he returns to his studio in Wales, he compiles as many as 1000 images to prepare a verist composition for a new painting. His underpaintings are very intricate and architectural. This results in colossal paintings measuring up to 9 feet in width.

Repentir App 
Walsh's intricate painting process is documented in an app called Repentir. The app works with his paintings, Transamerica (2013) and 23 Skidoo (2013). With the app, the user can take a photo of any, or the entire, painting and rewind the painting in time down to the underdrawing.

References

Further reading
 Meisel, Louis, Photorealism in the Digital Age (New York: Harry N. Abrams, Inc., 2013)
 Head, Clive, Nathan Walsh: New York Cityscapes (New York: Bernarducci Gallery, 2018).
 Press, Marina, Nathan Walsh: Cityscapes Paintings (New York: Bernarducci Meisel Gallery, 2013).

External links
Official Website 

1972 births
Living people
20th-century English painters
English male painters
21st-century English painters
Modern painters
Alumni of the University of Hull
Alumni of the University of Liverpool
20th-century English male artists
21st-century English male artists